Edward Cassatt may refer to:
Edward B. Cassatt (1869–1922), American soldier and racehorse breeder
Edward R. Cassatt (1839–1907), American politician from Iowa